John Cannon may refer to:
 John Cannon (American football) (born 1960), former member of the Tampa Bay Buccaneers
 John Cannon (historian) (1926–2012), British historian
 John Cannon (politician) (died 1833), Canadian builder and politician
 John Cannon (racing driver) (1933–1999), Canadian auto racer
 John Cannon (rugby union) (1980–2016), Canadian rugby union player
 John K. Cannon (1892–1955), U.S. Air Force general
 John Q. Cannon (1857–1931), American newspaper editor and general authority of The Church of Jesus Christ of Latter-day Saints
 Ace Cannon (John Cannon, 1934–2018), American saxophonist

See also
 Jack Cannon (disambiguation)
 John Canon (died 1798), founder and namesake of Canonsburg, Pennsylvania